Naft Chal may refer to:
 Naft Chal, Babolsar
 Naft Chal, Juybar
 Naft Chal, Savadkuh